Throw a Sickie is a 12" EP by New Zealand band Tall Dwarfs, released in 1986.

Track listing
"Underhand" - 1:50
"Road & Hedgehog" - 1:42
"Attack Of The Munchies" - 3:40
"Come Inside" - 2:27
"The Universality Of Neighbourliness" - 0:57
"The Big Dive" 3:06
"No Place" 1:22
"And Other Kinds" 3:45
"Farewell" - 2:12

References

Tall Dwarfs albums
1986 EPs
Flying Nun Records EPs